Sinchon station is a railway station in Sinch'ŏn-up, Sinch'ŏn County, South Hwanghae Province, North Korea, on the Ŭnnyul Line of the Korean State Railway.

History
Sinchon station was opened by the Chosen Railway on 16 November 1922.

References

Railway stations in North Korea